List of ambassadors of the Philippines may refer to:
List of ambassadors of the Philippines to Brunei
List of ambassadors of the Philippines to Egypt
List of ambassadors of the Philippines to France
List of ambassadors of the Philippines to Japan
List of ambassadors of the Philippines to Lebanon
List of ambassadors of the Philippines to Singapore
List of ambassadors of the Philippines to South Korea
List of ambassadors of the Philippines to Spain
List of ambassadors of the Philippines to Turkey
List of ambassadors of the Philippines to the United Kingdom
List of ambassadors of the Philippines to the United States

Lists of ambassadors by country of origin